Nationality words link to articles with information on the nation's poetry or literature (for instance, Irish or France).

Events
January – Five fragments of nine poems, some previously unknown, by Greek poet Sappho are discovered on ancient papyrus, including the Brothers Poem. This news is being reported by multiple news sources by the end of the month.
January 7  –  Michel Pleau is named Canadian Parliamentary Poet Laureate (or Canada's new poet laureate), beginning a two-year mandate to "draw Canadians’ attention to the reading and writing of poetry."
January 29  – Hashem Shabani, an Arab–Iranian poet, was executed by hanging in an unidentified Iranian prison after Iranian President Hassan Rouhani approved the sentences.
March 7 – For the first time ever, all five poets laureate of the British Isles are women and for the first time all five perform together at the Women of the World festival in London on the eve of International Women's Day. The poets are: Carol Ann Duffy (England), Liz Lochhead (Scotland), Gillian Clarke (Wales), Paula Meehan (Ireland), and Sinéad Morrissey (Northern Ireland).
March 19 – PEN International comes out with an action appeal protesting the two-year prison sentence handed down to Egyptian poet Omar Hazek. PEN states that this poet has been "imprisoned for peacefully exercising his right to freedom of expression and assembly." Hazek, who has won several poetry awards and is a former employee of the Bibliotheca Alexandrina, has been held in custody since early December 2013.
April 22 – The Writers' Trust of Canada announces the new Latner Writers' Trust Poetry Prize, a new Canadian literary award to honour the body of work of a Canadian poet who has published at least three volumes of poetry. The award is slated to be presented for the first time in November.
May 22 – The translation of Beowulf by J. R. R. Tolkien, which he had first completed in 1926, is published in England (after nearly 90 years) as Beowulf: A Translation and Commentary (his essay On Translating Beowulf had been published in 1940).
June 12 – The Library of Congress selects Charles Wright as the new United States Poet Laureate, succeeding Natasha Trethewey.
August 22 – New Zealand celebrates its own National Poetry Day, now in its 17th year, with more than 60 events held around the country. Included among the various readings and contests are events sponsoring the current New Zealand Poet Laureate, Vincent O’Sullivan, who reads poetry in Dunedin, and 2007–2009 Poet Laureate, Michele Leggott, who MCs the annual Auckland Library event.

Anniversaries
January 28 – On this day 75 years ago, W. B. Yeats died in Menton, France.
February 21 – Christopher Marlowe's 450th birthday celebrated (may or may not be his birthday).
March 9 – On this day 20 years ago, Charles Bukowski died (1994).
March 31 – On this day 100 years ago, Nobel Prize-winning Mexican poet Octavio Paz was born (1914).
April 23 – It is assumed that William Shakespeare was born on this day 450 years ago (because records show that he was baptised on April 26).
May – The 100th anniversary of Gertrude Stein's Tender Buttons.
September 4 – On this day 100 years ago, French poet and essayist Charles Péguy, 41 (born 1873) was killed in action near Villeroy, Seine-et-Marne, in the early months of World War I
October 10 – On this day 100 years ago, German poet Ernst Stadler, 31 (born 1883) was killed in battle at Zandvoorde near Ypres.
 – On this day 200 years ago Mikhail Lermontov was born; he is sometimes referred to as "Russia's second-greatest poet."
 October 25 – On this day 100 years ago, American poet John Berryman (given name:John Allyn Smith) was born.
 October 27 – On this day 100 years ago, Welsh poet Dylan Thomas was born in Swansea.
 October 30 – On this day 100 years ago, American poet and publisher James Laughlin, founder of New Directions Publishers, was born.
 November 3 – On this day 100 years ago, Austrian poet Georg Trakl, 27, committed suicide.

Works published in English

Australia

Benedict Andrews. Lens Flare. Sydney: Pitt Street Poetry
Louis Armand. Indirect Objects. Sydney: Vagabond Press
Judith Beveridge. Devadatta's Poems. Artarmon: Giramondo Publishing Company
a.j. carruthers. AXIS Book 1: Areal. Tokyo: Vagabond Press
Paul Carter. Ecstacies and Elegies. Perth: UWAP
Melinda Bufton. Girlery. Hobart: Inken Publisch
Nandi Chinna. Swamp. Fremantle: Fremantle Press
Eileen Chong. Peony. Sydney: Pitt Street Poetry
Dan Disney. Mannequin’s Guide to Utopias. Macau: ASM,
Benjamin Dodds. Regulator. Glebe: Puncher and Wattmann
Laurie Duggan. Allotments. Bristol: Shearsman Books
Anne Elvey. Kin. Parkville: Five Islands Press
Geoff Goodfellow. Opening the Windows to Catch the Sea Breeze. Kent Town: Wakefield Press
Libby Hart. Wild. Sydney: Pitt Street Poetry
Vrasidas Karalis and Helen Nickas, editors. Antigone Kefala: a writer’s journey. Brighton: Owl Publishing
Jacinta Le Plastrier. The Book of Skins. St Kilda: John Leonard Press
Alan Loney. eMailing flowers to Mondrian. Malvern East: Hawk Press
Kent MacCarter. Sputnik’s Cousin. Yarraville: Transit Lounge Publishing
John Mateer. Emptiness: Asian Poems, 1998 – 2012. Fremantle: Fremantle Press
Paul Scully. An Existential Grammar. North Hobart: Walleah Press
Marie Slaight & Terrence Tasker. The Antigone Poems. Potts Point: Altaire Publications
Maria Takolander. The End of the World. Artarmon: Giramondo Publishing Company
Tim Thorne. The Unspeak Poems and Other Verses. North Hobart: Walleah Press
Ann Vickery & John Hawke, editors. Poetry and The Trace. Glebe: Puncher and Wattmann
Chris Wallace-Crabbe. My Feet Are Hungry. Sydney: Pitt Street Poetry
Lucy Williams. Internal Weather. North Hobart: Walleah Press

Canada
Joanne Arnott – Halfling Spring
John Barton – Polari
Shane Book – Congotronic
Christopher Levenson – Night Vision
Garth Martens – Prologue for the Age of Consequence
Arleen Paré – Lake of Two Mountains

Anthologies in Canada
Why Poetry Sucks: Humorous Avant-Garde and Post-Avant English Canadian Poetry, Jonathan Ball & Ryan Fitzpatrick, editors. (Insomniac Press) 
Under the Mulberry Tree: poems for & about Raymond Souster, James Deahl, editor. (Quattro Books)

India
 Ranjit Hoskote, Central Time, Penguin India,

New Zealand
 Airini Beautrais, Dear Neil Roberts, Victoria University Press
 Kay McKenzie Cooke, Born to a Red-Headed Woman, Otago University Press
 Chris Tse, How to be Dead in a Year of Snakes, Auckland University Press

Poets in Best New Zealand Poems
Poems from these 25 poets were selected by Mark Williams and Jane Stafford for Best New Zealand Poems 2013, published online this year:

Fleur Adcock
Hinemoana Baker
Sarah Broom
Amy Brown
Kate Camp
Mary-Jane Duffy
Murray Edmond
Johanna Emeney
Cliff Fell
Bernadette Hall
Dinah Hawken
Caoilinn Hughes
Anna Jackson
Anne Kennedy
Michele Leggott
Therese Lloyd
Selina Tusitala Marsh
John Newton
Gregory O'Brien
Rachel O'Neill
Vincent O'Sullivan
Elizabeth Smither
Chris Tse
Ian Wedde
Ashleigh Young

United Kingdom

England
Liz Berry, Black Country (Chatto)
Colette Bryce, The Whole & Rain-domed Universe (Picador; Northern Ireland poet in England)
John Burnside, All One Breath (Cape)
Yrsa Daley-Ward, Bone
Lavinia Greenlaw, A Double Sorrow: Troilus and Criseyde (Faber)
Selima Hill, The Sparkling Jewel of Naturism (Bloodaxe Books)
Kei Miller, The Cartographer Tries to Map a Way to Zion (Carcanet; Jamaican poet in England)
Joss Sheldon, Involution & Evolution: A rhyming anti-war novel
Rosemary Tonks (died April 15), Bedouin of the London Evening: Collected Poems (Bloodaxe Books)
Hugo Williams, I Knew the Bride (Faber)

Ireland
Harry Clifton, The Holding Centre: Selected Poems 1974–2004 (BloodAxe Books)

Scotland
Stewart Conn, The Touch of Time: New & Selected Poems (BloodAxe Books)

Wales
Jonathan Edwards, My Family and Other Superheroes (Seren)

Anthologies in the United Kingdom
Ten: the new wave, edited by Karen McCarthy Woolf (BloodAxe)  – new poetry voices in Britain including Mona Arshi, Jay Bernard, Kayo Chingonyi, Rishi Dastidar, Edward Doegar, Inua Ellams, Sarah Howe, Adam Lowe, Eileen Pun and Warsan Shire

Criticism, scholarship and biography in the United Kingdom
Laura Jansen – The Roman Paratext: Frame, Texts, Readers. (Cambridge University Press)

United States

James Baldwin, Jimmy's Blues and Other Poems (Beacon Press)
Jared Carter, Darkened Rooms of Summer, (University of Nebraska Press)
Kendra DeColo, Thieves in the Afterlife (Saturnalia Books)
Arkadii Dragomoshchenko, Endarkment: Selected Poems, edited by Eugene Ostashevsky, translated by Lyn Hejinian, Genya Turovskaya, Eugene Ostashevsky, Bela Shayevich, Jacob Edmund & Elena Balashova (Wesleyan University)
Tarfia Faizullah, Seam (So. Illinois Univ. Press) 
Lizzie Harris, STOP WANTING (Cleveland State University Poetry Center) 
Matthea Harvey, If The Tabloids Are True, What Are You? (Graywolf Press)
Chloe Honum, The Tulip-Flame (Cleveland State University Poetry Center) 
Fanny Howe, Second Childhood (Graywolf Press)
Saeed Jones, Prelude to Bruise (Coffee House Press)
Keetje Kuipers, The Keys to the Jail (BOA Editions) 
Cathy Linh Che, Split (Alice james Books)
Sally Wen Mao, Mad Honey Symposium (Alice James Books)
Michael Mlekoday, The Dead Eat Everything (Kent State University Press) 
Eugenia Leigh, Blood, Sparrows and Sparrows (Four Way Books)
D. A. Powell, Repast (Graywolf Press) 
George Quasha, Speaking Animate (preverbs) (Between Editions)
Claudia Rankine, Citizen: An American Lyric (Graywolf Press)
Spencer Reece, The Road to Emmaus (Farrar, Straus and Giroux)
Nicholas Samaras, "American Psalm, World Psalm" (Ashland Poetry Press)
Danez Smith, [insert] Boy (YesYes Books)
Ron Silliman – Northern Soul, (Shearsman)
R. A. Villanueva, Reliquaria (University of Nebraska Press)
Caki Wilkinson, The Wynona Stone Poems (Persea Press) 
Jake Adam York, Abide (So. Illinois Univ. Press)
Kevin Young – Book of Hours,  (Knopf)

Anthologies in the United States
David Biespiel, editor. Poems of the American South (Random House)
Carolyn Forché & Duncan Wu, editors. Poetry of Witness: The Tradition in English, 1500–2001 (W. W. Norton)

Criticism, scholarship and biography in the United States
John Drury – Music at Midnight: The Life and Poetry of George Herbert. (University of Chicago Press)
Tom Hawkins  – Iambic Poetics in the Roman Empire (Cambridge University Press)
Ron Silliman – Against Conceptual Poetry (Counterpath Press)

Poets in The Best American Poetry 2014

Works published in other languages

French

German
Antony Theodore, Gottliche Augenblicke : Eine Reise durch das Jahr,

Awards and honors by country

Awards announced this year:

International
 Struga Poetry Evenings Golden Wreath Laureate: to Ko Un (South Korea)

Australia awards and honors
 C. J. Dennis Prize for Poetry: Jennifer Maiden, Liquid Nitrogen
 Kenneth Slessor Prize for Poetry: Fiona Hile, Novelties
 Prime Minister's Literary Awards: Melinda Smith, Drag Down to Unlock or Place an Emergency Call

Canada awards and honors
 Archibald Lampman Award: David O'Meara, A Pretty Sight
 Atlantic Poetry Prize: Don Domanski, Bite Down Little Whisper
 2014 Governor General's Awards: Arleen Paré, Lake of Two Mountains (English); José Acquelin, Anarchie de la lumière (French)
 Griffin Poetry Prize:
Canada: Anne Carson, Red Doc>
International: Brenda Hillman, Seasonal Works with Letters on Fire
Lifetime Recognition Award (presented by the Griffin trustees) to Adelia Prado
 Latner Writers' Trust Poetry Prize: Ken Babstock
 Gerald Lampert Award: Murray Reiss, The Survival Rate of Butterflies in the Wild
 Pat Lowther Award: Alexandra Oliver, Meeting the Tormentors in Safeway
 Prix Alain-Grandbois: Michaël Trahan, Nœud coulant
 Raymond Souster Award: Anne Compton, Alongside
 Dorothy Livesay Poetry Prize: Jordan Abel, The Place of Scraps
 Prix Émile-Nelligan: Roxanne Desjardins, Ciseaux

France awards and honors
Prix Goncourt de la Poésie: William Cliff

New Zealand awards and honors
 Prime Minister's Awards for Literary Achievement:
 New Zealand Post Book Awards:
 Poetry Award winner: Vincent O'Sullivan, Us, then. Victoria University Press
 NZSA Jessie Mackay Best First Book Award for Poetry: Marty Smith, Horse with Hat. Victoria University Press

India awards and honors
Sahitya Akademi Award : Adil Jussawalla for Trying to Say Goodbye (English)

United Kingdom awards and honors
 Cholmondeley Award: W. N. Herbert, Jeremy Hooker, John James, Glyn Maxwell, Denise Riley
 Costa Book Awards poetry award: Jonathan Edwards, My Family and Other Superheroes
 Shortlist: Colette Bryce, The Whole & Rain-domed Universe; Lavinia Greenlaw, A Double Sorrow: Troilus and Criseyde; Kei Miller, The Cartographer Tries to Map a Way to Zion
 English Association's Fellows' Poetry Prizes:
 Eric Gregory Award (for a collection of poems by a poet under the age of 30):
 Forward Prizes for Poetry:
Best Collection: Kei Miller, The Cartographer Tries to Map a Way to Zion
Shortlist: Colette Bryce, The Whole & Rain-domed Universe; John Burnside, All One Breath; Louise Glück, Faithful and Virtuous Night; Hugo Williams, I Knew the Bride
Felix Dennis Prize for Best First Collection: Liz Berry, Black Country
Shortlist:
Best Poem: Stephen Santus, "In a Restaurant"
Shortlist:
 Jerwood Aldeburgh First Collection Prize for poetry:
Shortlist:
 Manchester Poetry Prize:
 National Poet of Wales: Gillian Clarke (since 2008)
 National Poetry Competition : Roger Philip Dennis for Corkscrew Hill Photo  
 T. S. Eliot Prize (United Kingdom and Ireland): David Harsent, Fire Songs
Shortlist (announced in November 2014): 2014 Short List
 The Times/Stephen Spender Prize for Poetry Translation:

United States awards and honors
 Agnes Lynch Starrett Poetry Prize: Nate Marshall for Wild Hundreds
 AML Award for Poetry awarded to Kristen Eliason for Picture Dictionary
Finalists: Kimberly Johnson, Uncommon Prayer and Made Flesh: Sacrament and Poetics in Post-Reformation England; Laura Stott, In the Museum of Coming and Going
 Arab American Book Award (The George Ellenbogen Poetry Award): Philip Metres, A Concordance of Leaves
Honorable mentions: Farid Matuk, My Daughter La Chola; Fady Joudah, Alight
 Best Translated Book Award (BTBA):
 Beatrice Hawley Award from Alice James Books: Richie Hofmann, Second Empire
 Bollingen Prize: 
 Jackson Poetry Prize: Claudia Rankine.
Judges: Tracy K. Smith, David St. John, and Mark Strand
 Lambda Literary Award:
 Gay Poetry: Rigoberto González, Unpeopled Eden
 Lesbian Poetry: Ana Božičević, Rise in the Fall
 Lenore Marshall Poetry Prize:
 Los Angeles Times Book Prize: 
Finalists: Joshua Beckman, The Inside of an Apple (Wave Books); Mei-mei Berssenbrugge, Hello, the Roses (New Directions); Ron Padgett, Collected Poems (Coffee House Press); Elizabeth Robinson On Ghosts (Solid Objects); Lynn Xu, Debts & Lessons (Omnidawn)
 National Book Award for Poetry (NBA):
NBA Finalists:
Louise Glück, Faithful and Virtuous Night 
Fanny Howe, Second Childhood
Maureen N. McLane, This Blue
Fred Moten, The Feel Trio
Claudia Rankine, Citizen: An American Lyric 
NBA Longlist:
Linda Bierds, Roget's Illusion
Brian Blanchfield, A Several World 
 Edward Hirsch, Gabriel: A Poem 
Spencer Reece, The Road to Emmaus
Mark Strand, Collected Poems 
 National Book Critics Circle Award for Poetry: 
 The New Criterion Poetry Prize:  Fix Quiet by John Poch
 Pulitzer Prize for Poetry (United States): Vijay Seshadri, 3 Sections
Finalists: Morri Creech, The Sleep of Reason and Adrian Matejka, The Big Smoke (Penguin)
 Wallace Stevens Award: 
 Whiting Writers' Award (in Poetry): 
 PEN Award for Poetry in Translation:            – Judge:
 PEN/Voelcker Award for Poetry: Frank Bidart (Judges: Peg Boyers, Toi Derricotte, and Rowan Ricardo Phillips)
 Raiziss/de Palchi Translation Award:
 Ruth Lilly Poetry Prize: Nathaniel Mackey
 Kingsley Tufts Poetry Award: 
 Walt Whitman Prize – Hannah Sanghee Park for The Same-Different. – Judge: Rae Armantrout
 Yale Younger Series:

From the Poetry Society of America
 Frost Medal: Gerald Stern
 Shelley Memorial Award: Bernadette Mayer
 Writer Magazine/Emily Dickinson Award: Tom Thompson
 Lyric Poetry Award: Meghan Kemp-Gee
 Alice Fay di Castagnola Award: Timothy Donnelly 
 Louise Louis/Emily F. Bourne Student Poetry Award: Helen Ross
 George Bogin Memorial Award: Gary Young
 Robert H. Winner Memorial Award: Dore Kiesselbach – Judge: Alberto Rios
 Cecil Hemley Memorial Award: Ari Banias – Judge: 
 Norma Farber First Book Award: r. erica doyle
 Lucille Medwick Memorial Award: David Welch
 William Carlos Williams Award: Ron Padgett, Collected Poems (Judge: Thomas Lux)
Finalists for WCW Award:

Deaths
Birth years link to the corresponding "[year] in poetry" article:
January 7 – Alvin Aubert (born 1930), African-American poet and scholar
January 8 – Madeline Gins, 72 (born 1941), American poet, architect and long-time collaborator with artist Arakawa
January 9 – Amiri Baraka (LeRoi Jones), 79 (born 1934), controversial African-American poet and writer of drama, fiction, essays and music criticism, and former Poet Laureate of New Jersey
January 14 – Juan Gelman, 83 (born 1930), exiled Argentine poet and recipient of the Miguel de Cervantes Prize in 2007
February 1 – René Ricard, 67(?) (born 1946), American poet, art critic, painter, and actor in Andy Warhol's films
February 6  – Maxine Kumin, 88 (born 1925), U. S. American poet who won the Pulitzer Prize for Poetry, was Poetry Consultant to the Library of Congress (today known as the United States Poet Laureate), and wrote some seventeen books of poetry, novels, story collections, and memoirs
March 12 – Bill Knott, 74, (born 1940), U. S. American poet who published more than a dozen books of poetry between his first book in 1968 and his death
March 30 – Colleen Lookingbill, 63 (born 1950), U. S. American who edited, with Elizabeth Robinson, the EtherDome Chapbook series for 12 years, which published emerging women poets. She also co-edited Instance Press
April 2  – Vern Rutsala, 80 (born 1934), U.S. author and poet
April 14 – Nina Cassian, 89 (born 1924), Romanian poet, journalist, film critic, and translator. She translated works of William Shakespeare, Bertolt Brecht, Christian Morgenstern, Yiannis Ritsos, and Paul Celan into Romanian. She published more than fifty books of her own poetry
April 15 – Rosemary Tonks, 85 (born 1928), English poet and novelist
April 24 – Tadeusz Różewicz, 92 (born 1921), Polish poet and playwright, recipient of the Austrian State Prize for European Literature (1982)
April 28 – Gerard Benson, 83 (born 1931), English poet.
April 29 – Russell Edson, 76-86 (born 1935), American poet, novelist, writer and illustrator
May 10 – Hillary Gravendyk, 35 (born 1979), American poet and twice winner of the Eisner Prize in Poetry and author of Harm (Omnidawn, 2012) She lived with Idiopathic pulmonary fibrosis and had a double lung transplant five years before her death.
May 21 – Ruth Guimarães, 93 (born 1920), Afro-Brazilian classicist, fiction writer and poet
May 28 – Maya Angelou, 86 (born 1928), American author (I Know Why the Caged Bird Sings), poet ("On the Pulse of Morning") and civil rights activist*June 22 – Felix Dennis, 67 (born 1947), English publisher and poet
June 27 – Allen Grossman, 82 (born 1932), American poet, critic and professor, winner of the Bollingen Prize in 2009
June 29 – Dermot Healy, 66 (born 1947), Irish poet, playwright, short story writer, memoirist and novelist
August 5 – Diann Blakely, 57 (born 1957), American poet, who won the Alice Fay di Castagnola Award among many other honors
August 19 – Samih al-Qasim, 75 (born 1939), Palestinian Druze poet and journalist
Simin Behbahani, 87, Iranian writer and poet
Richard Dauenhauer, 72, American poet and translator
August 27 – Zaccheus Jackson, 36, Vancouver based Canadian Spoken word and Slam poet who was the 2013 Vancouver Grand Slam Champ
September 21 – Alastair Reid, 88 (born 1926), Scottish poet, essayist, and scholar
September 28 – Dannie Abse, 91 (born 1923), Welsh poet and doctor
October 9 – Carolyn Kizer, 89 (born 1925), American poet and Pulitzer Prize winner in 1985
October 14 – Ron Loewinsohn, 76, American poet and university professor Since his inclusion in Donald Allen's 1960 poetry anthology, The New American Poetry 1945–1960, numerous volumes of his poetry (along with two novels) were published
October 28 – Galway Kinnell, 87 (born 1927), American poet, Pulitzer Prize winner, a MacArthur Fellow and a former State Poet of Vermont; also served as a Chancellor of the Academy of American Poets
November 5 – Abdelwahab Meddeb, 68 (born 1946), Tunisian-born poet, Islamic scholar, essayist, novelist; lung cancer
November 13 – Manoel de Barros, 97 (born 1916), Brazilian poet who, before his death, considered by many authors, critics and readers to be Brazil's greatest living poet
November 19 – Jon Stallworthy, 79 (born 1935), English academic, poet and literary critic. Biographer of Wilfred Owen and Louis MacNeice
November 29 – Mark Strand, 80 (born 1934), Canadian-born American poet and writer, United States Poet Laureate (1990–1991)
December 4 – Claudia Emerson, 57 (born 1957), American poet
December 27 – Tomaž Šalamun, 73 (born 1941), Slovenian poet

See also

Poetry
List of poetry awards

References

2010s in poetry
2014 poems